The 6th European Badminton Championships were held in Preston (England), between 13 April and 15 April 1978, and hosted by the European Badminton Union and the Badminton England.

Medalists

Final results

Medal account

References

Results at BE 

European Badminton Championships
European Badminton Championships
B
European Badminton Championships
Badminton tournaments in England
1970s in Lancashire
International sports competitions hosted by England